Green Mountain Scenic Overlook and Trailhead is a small county park located a short distance west of Lake Apopka. It is managed by Lake County.

History
The land for the Green Mountain Scenic Overlook and Trailhead was leased to Lake County from the St. Johns River Water Management District. The overlook opened in October 2014, and connected to the Lake Apopka Loop Trail in 2015.

Recreation

Wildlife
At least 135 species of birds and nearly 20 species of butterflies have been seen at the overlook.

Access and hours of operation
Green Mountain Scenic Overlook and Trailhead is located at 20700 County Road 455, Montverde, Florida 34715. It is open daily, from 7:00am – Dusk.

References

Parks in Lake County, Florida